Calponin is a calcium binding protein. Calponin tonically inhibits the ATPase activity of myosin in smooth muscle. Phosphorylation of calponin by a protein kinase, which is dependent upon calcium binding to calmodulin, releases the calponin's inhibition of the smooth muscle ATPase.

Structure and function 
Calponin is mainly made up of α-helices with hydrogen bond turns. It is a binding protein and is made up of three domains. These domains in order of appearance are Calponin Homology (CH), regulatory domain (RD), and Click-23, domain that contains the calponin repeats. At the CH domain calponin binds to α-actin and filamin and binds to actin within the RD domain. Calmodulin, when activated by calcium may bind weakly to the CH domain and inhibit calponin binding with α-actin.   Calponin is responsible for binding many actin binding proteins, phospholipids, and regulates the actin/myosin interaction. Calponin is also thought to negatively affect the bone making process due to being expressed in high amounts in osteoblasts.

References

External links
 

Proteins